Buckinghamshire, abbreviated Bucks, is a ceremonial county in South East England that borders Greater London to the south-east, Berkshire to the south, Oxfordshire to the west, Northamptonshire to the north, Bedfordshire to the north-east and Hertfordshire to the east.

Buckinghamshire is one of the Home Counties, the counties of England that surround Greater London. Towns such as High Wycombe, Amersham, Chesham and the Chalfonts in the east and southeast of the county are parts of the London commuter belt, forming some of the most densely populated parts of the county, with some even being served by the London Underground.  Development in this region is restricted by the Metropolitan Green Belt. The county's largest settlement and only city is Milton Keynes in the northeast, which with the surrounding area is administered by Milton Keynes City Council as a unitary authority separately to the rest of Buckinghamshire. The remainder of the county is administered by Buckinghamshire Council as another unitary authority. Other large settlements include the county town of Aylesbury in the centre, the former county town of Buckingham in the northwest, Marlow in the south near the Thames and Princes Risborough in the west near Oxford. 

A large part of the Chiltern Hills, an Area of Outstanding Natural Beauty, runs through the south of the county and attracts many walkers and cyclists from London. In this area older buildings are often made from local flint and red brick. Many parts of the county are quite affluent and like many areas around London this has led to high housing costs: several reports have identified the market town of Beaconsfield as having among the highest property prices outside London. Chequers, a mansion estate owned by the government, is the country retreat of the incumbent Prime Minister. To the north of the county lies rolling countryside in the Vale of Aylesbury and around the Great Ouse. The Thames forms part of the county's southwestern boundary. Notable service amenities in the county are Pinewood Film Studios, Dorney rowing lake and part of Silverstone race track on the Northamptonshire border. Many national companies have head-offices or major centres in Milton Keynes. Heavy industry and quarrying is limited, with agriculture predominating after service industries.

History

The name Buckinghamshire is Anglo-Saxon in origin and means The district (scire) of Bucca's home. Bucca's home refers to Buckingham in the north of the county, and is named after an Anglo-Saxon landowner. The county has been so named since about the 12th century; however, the county has existed since it was a subdivision of the kingdom of Mercia (585–919).

The history of the area predates the Anglo-Saxon period and the county has a rich history starting from the Brythonic and Roman periods, though the Anglo-Saxons perhaps had the greatest impact on Buckinghamshire: the geography of the rural county is largely as it was in the Anglo-Saxon period. Later, Buckinghamshire became an important political arena, with King Henry VIII intervening in local politics in the 16th century, and just a century later the English Civil War was reputedly started by John Hampden in mid-Bucks.

Historically, the biggest change to the county came in the 19th century, when a combination of cholera and famine hit the rural county, forcing many to migrate to larger towns to find work. Not only did this alter the local economic situation, it meant a lot of land was going cheap at a time when the rich were more mobile, and leafy Bucks became a popular rural idyll: an image it still has today. Buckinghamshire is a popular home for London commuters, leading to greater local affluence; however, some pockets of relative deprivation remain.

The expansion of London and coming of the railways promoted the growth of towns in the south of the county such as Aylesbury, Amersham and High Wycombe, leaving the town Buckingham itself to the north in a relative backwater. As a result, most county institutions are now based in the south of the county or Milton Keynes, rather than in Buckingham.

Geography
The county can be split into two sections geographically. The south leads from the River Thames up the gentle slopes of the Chiltern Hills to the more abrupt slopes on the northern side leading to the Vale of Aylesbury and the City of Milton Keynes UA, a large and relatively level expanse of land that is the southern catchment of the River Great Ouse.

Waterways

Rivers
The county includes parts of two of the four longest rivers in England. The River Thames forms the southern boundary with Berkshire, which has crept over the border at Eton and Slough so that the river is no longer the sole boundary between the two counties. The River Great Ouse rises just outside the county in Northamptonshire and flows east through Buckingham, Milton Keynes and Olney.

Canals

The main branch of the Grand Union Canal passes through the county as do its arms to Slough, Aylesbury, Wendover (disused) and Buckingham (disused). The canal has been incorporated into the landscaping of Milton Keynes.

Landscape
The southern part of the county is dominated by the Chiltern Hills.

Mineral extraction
Quarrying has taken place for chalk, clay for brickmaking and gravel and sand in the river valleys. Flint, also extracted from quarries, was often used to build older local buildings. Several former quarries, now flooded, have become nature reserves.

Demography

Buckinghamshire is sub-divided into civil parishes.

Today Buckinghamshire is ethnically diverse, particularly in the larger towns. At the end of the 19th century some Welsh drover families settled in north Bucks and, in the last quarter of the 20th century, a large number of Londoners in Milton Keynes. Between 6 and 7% of the population of Aylesbury are of Asian or Asian British origin. Likewise Chesham has a similar-sized Asian community, and High Wycombe is the most ethnically diverse town in the county, with large Asian and Afro-Caribbean populations. During the Second World War there were many Polish settlements in Bucks, Czechs in Aston Abbotts and Wingrave, and Albanians in Frieth. Remnants of these communities remain in the county.

Politics

Ceremonial

The ceremonial county of Buckinghamshire consists of both unitary authority areas combined. The ceremonial county has a Lord Lieutenant and a High Sheriff. Since November 2020, the Lord Lieutenant of Buckinghamshire is The Countess Elizabeth Howe and the High Sheriff of Buckinghamshire is George Anson. The office of Custos rotulorum has been combined with that of Lord Lieutenant since 1702.

Buckinghamshire County Council (1889–1997) 
Until 31 March 2020, the ceremonial county had two top-level administrations: Buckinghamshire County Council, which administered about four-fifths of the county, and Milton Keynes City Council, a unitary authority, which administers the remaining fifth. There were four district councils that are subsidiary to the county council: Aylesbury Vale, Chiltern, South Bucks and Wycombe districts.

The county council was founded in 1889 with its base in new municipal buildings in Walton Street, Aylesbury (which are still there). In Buckinghamshire, local administration was run on a two-tier system where public services were split between the county council and a number of district councils.

In 1966, the council moved into new premises: a 15-storey tower block in the centre of Aylesbury (pictured) designed by county architect Fred Pooley. It is now a Grade II listed building.

Buckinghamshire County Council (1997–2020)
In 1997, the northernmost part of Buckinghamshire, the part of Buckinghamshire north of the Varsity Line together with Bow Brickhill, Woburn Sands, and parts of Bletchley and Fenny Stratford, until then Milton Keynes District, was separated to form a unitary authority, the Borough of Milton Keynes; for ceremonial purposes Milton Keynes remains part of Buckinghamshire. The administration of the remainder of the county continued to be called Buckinghamshire County Council. 

Buckinghamshire County Council was a large employer in the county and provided a variety of services, including education (schools, adult education and youth services), social services, highways, libraries, County Archives and Record Office, the County Museum and the Roald Dahl Children's Gallery in Aylesbury, consumer services and some aspects of waste disposal and planning.

Buckinghamshire Council (2020 onwards) 
Buckinghamshire Council is a unitary authority covering most of the ceremonial county of Buckinghamshire. It was created in April 2020 from the areas that were previously administered by Buckinghamshire County Council and the district councils of South Bucks, Chiltern, Wycombe, Aylesbury Vale.

Milton Keynes City Council
Milton Keynes City Council was formed by the Local Government Act 1972 as the "Milton Keynes District Council", subordinate to Buckinghamshire County Council. The (district) council was first elected in 1973, a year before formally coming into its powers and prior to the creation of the District of Milton Keynes on 1 April 1974. The council gained borough status, entitling it to be known as "Milton Keynes Borough Council" and to annually appoint a (ceremonial) Mayor of Milton Keynes. On 1 April 1997, it became a self-governing unitary authority. In 2022, the Borough of Milton Keynes became the City of Milton Keynes, following award of Letters Patent.

Flag
The traditional flag of Buckinghamshire comprises a chained swan on a bicolour of red and black. The flag was registered with the Flag Institute on 20 May 2011.

Coat of arms

The coat of arms of the former Buckinghamshire County Council features a white swan in chains. This dates back to the Anglo-Saxon period, when swans were bred in Buckinghamshire for the king's pleasure. That the swan is in chains illustrates that the swan is bound to the monarch, an ancient law that still applies to wild swans in the UK today. The arms were first borne at the Battle of Agincourt by the Duke of Buckingham.

Above the swan is a gold band, in the centre of which is Whiteleaf Cross, representing the many ancient landmarks of the county. The shield is surmounted by a beech tree, representing the Chiltern Forest that once covered almost half the county. Either side of the shield are a buck, for Buckingham, and a swan, the county symbol.

The motto of the shield is Vestigia Nulla Retrorsum. This is Latin and means 'no stepping back' (or 'no steps backwards').

Economy

Buckinghamshire has a modern service-based economy and is part of the Berkshire, Buckinghamshire and Oxfordshire NUTS-2 region, which was the seventh richest subregion in the European Union in 2002. As well as the highest GDP per capita outside Inner London, Buckinghamshire has the highest quality of life, the highest life expectancy and the best education results in the country. The southern part of the county is a prosperous section of the London commuter belt. The county has fertile agricultural lands, with many landed estates, especially those of the Rothschild banking family of England in the 19th century (see Rothschild properties in England). The county has several annual agricultural shows, with the Bucks County Show established in 1859. Manufacturing industries include furniture-making (traditionally centred at High Wycombe), pharmaceuticals and agricultural processing. Pinewood Studios in Iver Heath is a principal centre of operations for film and TV production in the UK.

This is a chart of trend of regional gross value added of Buckinghamshire at current basic prices published by the Office for National Statistics with figures in millions of British Pounds sterling (except GVA index).

Places of interest

Buckinghamshire is notable for its open countryside and natural features, including the Chiltern Hills Area of Outstanding Natural Beauty, Stowe Landscaped Gardens near Buckingham, and the River Thames. The Ridgeway Path, a long-distance footpath, passes through the county. The county also has many historic houses. Some of these are opened to the public by the National Trust, such as Waddesdon Manor, West Wycombe Park and Cliveden. Other historic houses are still in use as private homes, such as the Prime Minister's country retreat Chequers.

Claydon House (near Steeple Claydon), Hughendon Manor (near High Wycombe), Stowe Landscaped Gardens, and Waddesdon Manor (near Aylesbury) are in the care of the National Trust.

Mentmore Towers, a 19th-century English country house built by the Rothschilds is located the village of Mentmore. It is the largest of the English Rothschild houses and is known for its Jacobean-styled architecture designed by Joseph Paxton.

Bletchley Park in Milton Keynes is the site of World War II British codebreaking and Colossus, the world's first programmable electronic digital computer. Together with the co-located National Museum of Computing, it is a nationally important visitor attraction.

Examples of historical architecture in the Chiltern region are preserved at the Chiltern Open Air Museum, an open-air folk museum near Chalfont St Giles. The  site contains reconstructed buildings which might otherwise have been destroyed or demolished as a result of redevelopment or road construction.

The market town of Olney, in the City of Milton Keynes UA, is home to Cowper and Newton Museum which celebrates the work and lives of two famous figures: William Cowper (1731–1800) a celebrated 18th-century poet; and John Newton, a prominent slave trade abolitionist who was curate in the local church. Together, Cowper and Newton wrote the Olney Hymns, including one of the world's most popular hymns, Amazing Grace.

Buckinghamshire is the home of various notable people in connection with whom tourist attractions have been established: for example the author Roald Dahl who included many local features and characters in his works. Artists William Callow and Harriet Anne Smart Callow produced many paintings of the area in the late 19th century.

Sports facilities in Buckinghamshire include half of the international Silverstone Circuit which straddles the Buckinghamshire and Northamptonshire border, the Adams Park Stadium in the south and Stadium MK in the north, and Dorney Lake (named 'Eton Dorney' for the event) was used as the rowing venue for the 2012 Summer Olympics.

Television
The county is covered by three terrestrial television transmitters:  Oxford (BBC South and ITV Meridian regions), covering the western side of the county, Sandy Heath (BBC East and ITV Anglia) covering the north and east of the county, and Crystal Palace (BBC London & ITV London), covering the south of the county.

Transport

Roads

The ceremonial county of Buckinghamshire is served by four motorways, although two are on its borders:
 M1 motorway: serves Milton Keynes in the north.
 M4 motorway: passes through the very south of the county with only J7 in Bucks.
 M25 motorway: passes into Bucks but has only one junction (J16-interchange for the M40).
 M40 motorway: cuts through the south of the county serving towns such as High Wycombe and Beaconsfield.

Five important A roads also enter the county (from north to south):
 A4: serves Taplow in the very south.
 A5: serves Milton Keynes.
 A421: serves Milton Keynes and Buckingham; links the M1 to the M40.
 A40: parallels M40 through south Bucks and continues to Central London.
 A41: cuts through the centre of the county from Watford to Bicester, serving Aylesbury.

Also less important primary A roads enter the country:
A404: serves Marlow and High Wycombe.
A509: serves the north of the county through Olney, crossing the M1 at J14, ending at the A5 in Milton Keynes.
A4010: runs from M40 J4 (High Wycombe) to Stoke Mandeville.
A4146: runs from Leighton Buzzard (Bedfordshire) to Milton Keynes.

The county is poorly served with internal routes, with the A413 and A418 linking the south and north of the county.

Rail

As part of the London commuter belt, Buckinghamshire is well connected to the national rail network, with both local commuter and inter-city services serving some destinations.

Chiltern Railways is a principal train operating company in Buckinghamshire, providing the majority of local commuter services from the centre and south of the county, with trains running into .

Avanti West Coast operates inter-city services from Milton Keynes Central to Euston, North West England, the West Midlands, the Scottish Central Belt, and North Wales. Great Western operates non-stop services through the south of the county from Paddington to South West England and South Wales.

There are four main lines running through the county:

The West Coast Main Line in the north of the county serves stations in Milton Keynes
London to Aylesbury Line serves Aylesbury and other settlements along the A413 towards London. Once part of the Metropolitan line of London Underground, which now runs to Amersham
Chiltern Main Line: serves the towns along the M40 motorway including High Wycombe and Beaconsfield
Great Western Main Line: runs through Slough. Slough is now in Berkshire, but the line enters Bucks twice, on either side of Slough, with Taplow and Iver both having stations in Buckinghamshire.

There are the following additional lines:

Princes Risborough to Aylesbury Line: a single track branch that connects the Chiltern Main Line to the London to Aylesbury Line.
Marston Vale Line: between Bletchley and Bedford.
Marlow Branch Line: between Marlow, Bourne End and Maidenhead.
Chinnor and Princes Risborough Railway, a preserved railway.
 The new Elizabeth line (constructed as Crossrail) serves Iver. 

The line between Aylesbury and Claydon Junction may also be reinstated in the same programme, enabling services between Aylesbury and Milton Keynes, but this option is not programmed. Construction of High Speed 2 is also underway and is planned to run non-stop through the county at some future date.

Settlements

For the full list of towns, villages and hamlets in Buckinghamshire, see List of places in Buckinghamshire. Throughout history, there have been a number of changes to the Buckinghamshire boundary.

Education

Artist and composer Harriet Anne Smart started a school in Buckinghamshire in the 1850s to teach local laborers how to read. Today, education in Buckinghamshire is governed by two Local Education Authorities. Buckinghamshire Council is one of the few remaining LEAs still using the tripartite system, albeit with some revisions such as the abolition of secondary technical schools. It has a completely selective education system: pupils transfer either to a grammar school or to a secondary modern school or free school depending on how they perform in the Eleven-Plus exam and on their preferences. Pupils who do not take the test can only be allocated places at secondary modern schools or free school. There are 9 independent schools and 34 maintained (state) secondary schools, not including sixth form colleges, in the county council area. There is also the Buckinghamshire University Technical College which offers secondary education from age 14. The unitary authority of Milton Keynes operates a comprehensive education system: there are 8 maintained (state) secondary schools in the City Council area.

Buckinghamshire is also home to the University of Buckingham, Buckinghamshire New University, the National Film and Television School, and the Open University. The University of Bedfordshire has a campus in Milton Keynes.

Notable people 

Buckinghamshire is the birthplace and/or final resting place of several notable individuals. St Osyth was born in Quarrendon and was buried in Aylesbury in the 7th century while at about the same time Saint Rumwold was buried in Buckingham. In the medieval period Roger of Wendover was, as the name suggests, from Wendover and Anne Boleyn also owned property in the same town. It is said that King Henry VIII made Aylesbury the county town in preference to Buckingham because Boleyn's father owned property there and was a regular visitor himself. Other medieval residents included Edward the Confessor, who had a palace at Brill, and John Wycliffe who lived in Ludgershall.

Buckinghamshire later became home to some notable literary characters. Edmund Waller was brought up in Beaconsfield and served as Member of Parliament (MP) for both Amersham and Wycombe. Mary Shelley and her husband Percy Bysshe Shelley  lived for some time in Marlow, attracted to the town by their friend Thomas Love Peacock who also lived there. John Milton lived in Chalfont St Giles and his cottage can still be visited there and John Wilkes was MP for Aylesbury. Later authors include Jerome K. Jerome who lived at Marlow, T. S. Eliot who also lived at Marlow, Roald Dahl who lived at Great Missenden, Enid Blyton who lived in Beaconsfield and Edgar Wallace who lived at Bourne End and is buried in Little Marlow. Modern-day writers from Bucks include Terry Pratchett who was born in Beaconsfield, Tim Rice who is from Amersham and Andy Riley who is from Aylesbury.

During the Second World War a number of European politicians and statesmen were exiled in England. Many of these settled in Bucks as it is close to London. President Edvard Beneš of Czechoslovakia lived at Aston Abbotts with his family while some of his officials were stationed at nearby Addington and Wingrave. Meanwhile, Władysław Sikorski, military leader of Poland, lived at Iver and King Zog of Albania lived at Frieth. Much earlier, King Louis XVIII of France lived in exile at Hartwell House from 1809 to 1814.

Also on the local political stage Buckinghamshire has been home to Nancy Astor who lived in Cliveden, Frederick, Prince of Wales who also lived in Cliveden, Baron Carrington who lives in Bledlow, Benjamin Disraeli who lived at Hughenden Manor and was made Earl of Beaconsfield, John Hampden who was from Great Hampden and is revered in Aylesbury to this day and Prime Minister Archibald Primrose, 5th Earl of Rosebery who lived at Mentmore. Also worthy of note are William Penn who believed he was descended from the Penn family of Penn and so is buried nearby and the current Prime Minister of the United Kingdom, who has an official residence at Chequers. John Archdale, the colonial governor of North Carolina and South Carolina, was born in Buckinghamshire.

Other notable natives of Buckinghamshire include:

 Amber Bain, musician, known as The Japanese House
 Errol Barnett, news reporter, was born in Milton Keynes
 Nick Beggs, musician, is from Winslow
 Lynda Bellingham, actress, was from Aylesbury
 Emily Bergl, actress, born in Milton Keynes, though her family moved to suburban Chicago a few years after her birth
 Emmerson Boyce, Wigan Athletic footballer, was born in Aylesbury
 Nick Bracegirdle aka Chicane, was born in Chalfont St Giles
 Den Brotheridge, British Army Officer who died taking Pegasus Bridge in France was from Aylesbury
 Charles Butler, pastor, grammarian, and pioneering beekeeper was born in the county
 Giles Cooper, entertainment producer, best known for Royal Variety Performance was born in Amersham, brought up in High Wycombe
 James Corden, actor, grew up in Hazlemere
 John Crowder (1756–1830), alderman of the ward of Farringdon Within, and Lord Mayor of London
 Lucinda Dryzek, actress, born in High Wycombe
 Emma Ferreira English contemporary artist, sculptor, photographer, entrepreneur and philanthropist
 Martin Grech, musician, is from Aylesbury
 Julian Haviland, former Political Editor of both ITN and The Times'' newspaper, was born and brought up in Iver Heath in Iver
 Howard Jones, musician, is from High Wycombe
 Prince Michael of Kent, member of the British Royal Family, born in Iver in south Bucks* Arthur Lasenby Liberty, merchant, was from Chesham
 Richard Lee, footballer, attended Aylesbury Grammar School
 Jonathon Lewis, England test cricketer, was born in Aylesbury
 Al Murray, television/radio presenter also known as The Pub Landlord originates from Stewkley
 John Otway, musician, is from Aylesbury
 Leigh-Anne Pinnock, singer and member of 2011 X-Factor winning girl group Little Mix, born in High Wycombe
 Matt Phillips, footballer playing for Queens Park Rangers F.C., was born in Aylesbury
 Dominic Raab, politician, Conservative Party Member of Parliament (MP) and current Foreign Secretary, grew up in Gerrards Cross and attended Dr Challoner's Grammar School in Amersham
 Steve Redgrave, five-time Olympic gold medallist rower is from Marlow Bottom
 George Gilbert Scott, architect famous for his numerous Gothic revival buildings, born in Gawcott
 Simon Standage, Baroque violinist, is from High Wycombe
 Justin Sullivan, musician with New Model Army
 Michael York, actor, born in Fulmer in south Bucks
 Jack Garratt, singer-songwriter, is from Little Chalfont

Notable celebrities living in Buckinghamshire include:

 Cilla Black, television presenter, lived in Denham
 Fern Britton, television presenter, lives in Holmer Green
 Melanie Brown, musician, lived in Little Marlow
 Roy Castle, dancer, singer, comedian, actor, television presenter and musician lived in Gerrards Cross
 John Craven, television presenter, lives in Princes Risborough
 Cheryl Cole, Singer, dancer, lives in Chalfont St. Peter
 Tess Daly has a house in Fulmer
 Iain Duncan Smith, politician, lives in Swanbourne
 Ian Dury, musician, lived in Wingrave
 Noel Edmonds, television presenter, once lived in Weston Turville
 Andrew Fletcher, musician with Depeche Mode, has a home in Marlow
 Barry Gibb, musician from Bee Gees, lives in Beaconsfield
 Sir John Gielgud, actor, was living in Wotton Underwood when he died
 Polly Ho-Yen, author
 Sir David Jason, actor, lives in Ellesborough
 Peter Jones, businessman, lives in Beaconsfield
 Jason "Jay" Kay, musician and frontman of Jamiroquai, lives in Horsenden
 Vernon Kay has a house in Fulmer
 John Laurie, actor, lived in Chalfont St Peter
 Fern Britton, television presenter, lives in Holmer Green
 Hayley Mills and Roy Boulting lived in Ibstone
 John Mills, actor, lived in Denham
 Mike Oldfield, musician, once lived in Little Chalfont
 Nduka Onwuegbute, playwright, lives in Aylesbury
 Ozzy Osbourne, musician, has a home in Jordans
 Liam Payne, musician, One Direction member, has a rented home in Chalfont St. Peter
 Pauline Quirke, actress, lives in Penn
 Joan G. Robinson, author and illustrator
 Steve Rothery, musician with Marillion, lives in Whitchurch
 Rothschild family, bankers, had houses in Ascott, Aston Clinton, Eythrope, Halton, Mentmore and Waddesdon
 Tiny Rowland, businessman, lived in Hedsor
 Chris Standring, jazz guitarist and musician
 Jackie Stewart, three-time Formula One world championship winner, lives in Ellesborough
 Andrew Strauss, England cricket captain, lives in Marlow
 Dave Vitty, former BBC Radio 1 DJ, lives in Fulmer
 Mark Webber, former Formula 1 racing driver, lives in Aston Clinton
 Terry Wogan, radio and television broadcaster, lived in Taplow

See also

 Architecture of Aylesbury
 Bucks County, Pennsylvania
 Centre for Buckinghamshire Studies—Archives, Record Office, Local History and Family History
 Duke of Buckingham
 Safety Centre
 Wendover Woods

Notes

References

External links

 Buckinghamshire County Council
 Buckinghamshire County Museum and Roald Dahl Children's Gallery
 Buckinghamshire Libraries
 Buckinghamshire Tourist Guide
 Bucks County and District Councils Portal
 Photographic Archive of Buckinghamshire
 Images of Buckinghamshire at the English Heritage Archive

 
Non-metropolitan counties
South East England
Home counties
Counties of England established in antiquity